Number: The Language of Science: A Critical Survey Written for the Cultured Non-Mathematician is a popular mathematics book written by Russian-American mathematician Tobias Dantzig. The original U.S. publication was by Macmillan in 1930. A second edition (third impression) was published in 1947 in Prague, Czechoslovakia by Melantrich Company. It recounts the history of mathematical ideas, and how they have evolved.

Chapters 

The book is divided into 12 chapters. There is an appendix of illustrations. The third edition of the book contains a separate section for essays, at the book's end.

 Fingerprints
 The Empty Column
 Number Lore
 The Last Number 
 Symbols
 The Unutterable
 This Flowing World
 The Act of Becoming
 Filling the Gaps
 The Domain of Number
 The Anatomy of the Infinite
 The Two Realities

References 

Popular mathematics books
1932 non-fiction books